William T. Mohl (born June 1, 1984) is an American baseball coach, who is the current the head baseball coach of the South Florida Bulls. Mohl played baseball for the Tulane Green Wave baseball team while obtaining a degree.

Playing career
Mohl played college baseball at Tulane University during the 2003 through 2006 seasons. As a freshman in 2003, Mohl was named to the Conference USA All-Freshman team. After the 2003 season, he played collegiate summer baseball for the Falmouth Commodores of the Cape Cod Baseball League, and was named a league all-star. Mohl completed his career at Tulane with a 25–7 record. He still ranks in the top 10 in several pitching categories at the school. 

Mohl was then drafted in the 25th round of the 2006 Major League Baseball draft by the Philadelphia Phillies.

Coaching career
After spending a season as an assistant while wrapping up his undergraduate degree at Tulane and two years as a volunteer assistant, Mohl became an assistant at Illinois State in 2010.

When Mark Kingston was hired by the South Florida Bulls baseball team, he brought Mohl with him to be his pitching coach.

On June 30, 2017, Mohl was promoted to head coach of the Bulls beginning the 2018 season.

Head coaching record

See also
 List of current NCAA Division I baseball coaches

References

External links

South Florida Bulls bio

Living people
1984 births
Tulane Green Wave baseball players
Falmouth Commodores players
Tulane Green Wave baseball coaches
Illinois State Redbirds baseball coaches 
South Florida Bulls baseball coaches